Alain Simard  (born 1950 in Montreal, Quebec) produces concerts, shows, and manages urban festivals. He conceived and founded the Festival International de Jazz de Montréal, the FrancoFolies de Montréal and MONTRÉAL EN LUMIÈRE, and is also the President-CEO of L'Équipe Spectra. In December 2019, Simard was named an Officer of the Order of Canada.

References

External links 
 L'Équipe Spectra
 Music Canada

1950 births
Living people
Businesspeople from Montreal
Officers of the Order of Canada